Papà prende moglie is an Italian comedy television series. The title means Dad takes a wife.

Cast
Marco Columbro: Andrea Marchi
Nancy Brilli: Francesca Banfi
Myriam Catania: Sara Marchi
Simone Cipelletti: Riccardo Marchi 
Nini Salerno: Giovanni
Marco Vivio: Giuseppe
Franca Valeri:  Andrea's Mother
Erika Blanc: Francesca's Mother

See also
List of Italian television series

References

External links
 

Italian comedy television series
Canale 5 original programming

1993 Italian television series debuts